Henry Munson Utley (August 5, 1836 – February 16, 1917) was an American librarian. Utley served as president of the American Library Association from 1894 to 1895. Utley graduated from the University of Michigan in 1861 and 1866. Utley had a career in journalism before being named City Librarian for the City of Detroit in 1885. He retired from that position in 1913.

Bibliography
 Volume 1: Michigan as a province, from its discovery and settlement by the French to its final surrender to the United States Michigan as a province, territory and state, the twenty-sixth member of the federal Union (Publishing Society of Michigan, 1906)
 Volume 4: Michigan as a state, from the close of the civil war to the end of the nineteenth century Michigan as a province, territory and state, the twenty-sixth member of the federal Union (Publishing Society of Michigan, 1906)

See also
 Detroit Public Library

References

 

American librarians
1836 births
1917 deaths
University of Michigan alumni